Frank Arneil Walker OBE is a Scottish architectural academic and writer.

He is emeritus professor of architecture of the University of Strathclyde. He writes regularly on architectural and urban history, is author of The South Clyde Estuary, and co-author of The North Clyde Estuary and Central Glasgow in the Royal Incorporation of Architects in Scotland series of handbooks on Scottish architecture.

He is also a contributor to the Buildings of Scotland series, having written Argyll and Bute and co-written Stirling and Central Scotland.

Walker was awarded the OBE in 2002 for services to architectural history and conservation.

References

People from Renfrewshire
Officers of the Order of the British Empire
Scottish architecture writers
Academics of the University of Strathclyde
Living people
Architecture academics
Year of birth missing (living people)